Steven Božinovski (born 16 June 1981) is a former professional Australian soccer player.

Career
Born in Sydney, Australia, a son of Macedonian emigrants, he started his career in 1998 with the Bankstown City Lions, a club strongly supported by his fatherland community. The next year, he moved to another Macedonian community backed club, the rival Rockdale City Suns.  After one year there, he moved to Sydney United. After a poor 1999–2000 season, he returned to Rockdale where, excepting a short stint in the Marconi Stallions in the 2001–02 season, he stayed until 2004. With the Rockdale Suns he won the 2002 NSW Second Division. In summer of 2004, he moved to Europe where he played the first part of the 2004–2005 season in the First League of Serbia and Montenegro club Radnički Niš, and then, in winter, moved to Jupiler League club K.V. Oostende. He returned to Sydney the next year to play in A.P.I.A. Leichhardt. In 2006, he had a short stint in an A-League club Sydney FC, before signing in 2007 for the Bonnyrigg White Eagles.

References

External links
 Profile in OzFootball
 Profile on Bonnyrigg Website

Soccer players from Sydney
Australian people of Macedonian descent
Australian expatriate soccer players
Bankstown City FC players
Sydney United 58 FC players
Marconi Stallions FC players
FK Radnički Niš players
Expatriate footballers in Serbia
Expatriate footballers in Belgium
APIA Leichhardt FC players
Sydney FC players
A-League Men players
Bonnyrigg White Eagles FC players
Association football defenders
1981 births
Living people
Rockdale Ilinden FC players
Australian soccer players
Australian Macedonian soccer managers